Carole Tucker is a Professor at the School of Physics and Astronomy, Cardiff University. She is a Fellow of the Learned Society of Wales (elected 2018), and a member of the Institute of Physics and the Royal Astronomical Society. Her research focuses on astronomy instrumentation in the fields of far infra-red quasi-optics and spectroscopy. She is a member of the UK EPSRC THz Network, Teranet and a reviewer for the IEEE Transactions on Terahertz Science and Technology.

Research 
Tucker's publications reflect a host of world-wide astronomical collaborations, which show how the technological developments of her research group are deployed on virtually all FIR telescopes in the world.  In the last 2 years, the publications related to this work have accelerated, in line with the current development/instrument work on the next generation CMB and FIR instruments in Europe and the US.

Full list of published research can be found via ORCID.

Education and career 

 1991    BSc (Hons) Physics with Mathematics 2(i). Reading University
 1992    EC Diploma, “Qualified Expert in Medical Physics and Radiotherapy”.
 1992    MSc Medical Radiation Physics. QMUL, University of London. Dissertation title “The design and testing of an organic scintillation dosimeter”.
 2000    PhD Physics. University of London. Thesis title: “A spectroscopic study of charge transfer processes at organo-metallic interfaces.” This period of study was undertaken on a part-time basis whilst employed as a Research Technician 
 1999 – 2001    PDRA Astrophysics Instrumentation Group, Queen Mary & Westfield College, University of London
 2001-2005       PDRA Astrophysics Instrumentation Group, Cardiff University.
 2006-2011      Temporary Lecturer, to Lecturer, then Senior Lecturer at Cardiff University.
 2013-2018      Deputy Head of School, Director of Learning and Teaching, School of Physics and Astronomy, Cardiff University.
 2014                Chair, School of Physics and Astronomy, Cardiff University

Industry 
Tucker is the academic consultant to the technology spin-out company, QMCI Ltd for commercial supply of filter technology and provision of QA documentation.

References 

Welsh astronomers
Year of birth missing (living people)
Living people
Academics of Cardiff University
British women physicists